Maimuru is a small village in southern New South Wales, Australia. The locality is in the Hilltops Council local government area.

At the 2016 census, Maimuru had a population of 137, which had increased to 145 at the 2021 census.

Maimuru Public School, located in School Road, celebrated its centenary in 2021.

References 

Populated places in New South Wales
Hilltops Council